Mine All Mine is a British television series produced by Red Production Company for ITV. It was written by Russell T Davies and starred Griff Rhys Jones. The story takes place in Swansea, Wales.

Overview
Rhys Jones plays Max Vivaldi, an eccentric taxi driver and family man who has gone through life believing that the land upon which the Welsh city of Swansea was built belonged to an ancestor of his and therefore Swansea technically belongs to him. This was based on the tale of the Welsh pirate Robert Edwards and his descendants' claim to  real estate in Lower Manhattan, New York City.

He is in possession of a document that he claims proves this to be the case, although nobody believes him.  When an antiquities expert from London is dispatched to the Vivaldi home to appraise an antique telephone, the document proving Max's inheritance is authenticated as real and thus begins the process of Vivaldi attempting to exercise control over the city that is rightly his.

Mine All Mine consisted of four forty-five-minute episodes and one 90 minute finale. However, this was edited down from a longer six-part version, the full content of which is available on the DVD release. On the commentary track for the DVD, writer Russell T Davies explains that most of episode five was cut to make it the right length for broadcast.

The series aired in the United States on BBC America and in Asia on BBC Entertainment.

References

External links
 
 Review at British Drama.org.uk

2000s British drama television series
2004 British television series debuts
2004 British television series endings
2000s British television miniseries
ITV television dramas
Television shows written by Russell T Davies
Television shows set in Wales
Television series created by Russell T Davies